= Susurrus Station =

Eclectic music group

Susurrus Station is an eclectic music project formed by the American artist Jason Breeden and Swedish musician Sara Johanne in 2003 in Stockholm, Sweden. The songs vary considerably stylistically, and are sometimes densely packed with lyrics, lush instrumentation and sonic remnants of experimental music and blues.

Breeden and Johanne formed the independent record label AIO Soundings in 2006. They play and record in several other projects as well, notably Pikara, billed as Johanne's solo project, and Nigh Chaparral, a collaborative recording series. They also play in the rock band Zouaves, as well as the absurdist undertaking, Dead Cinema.

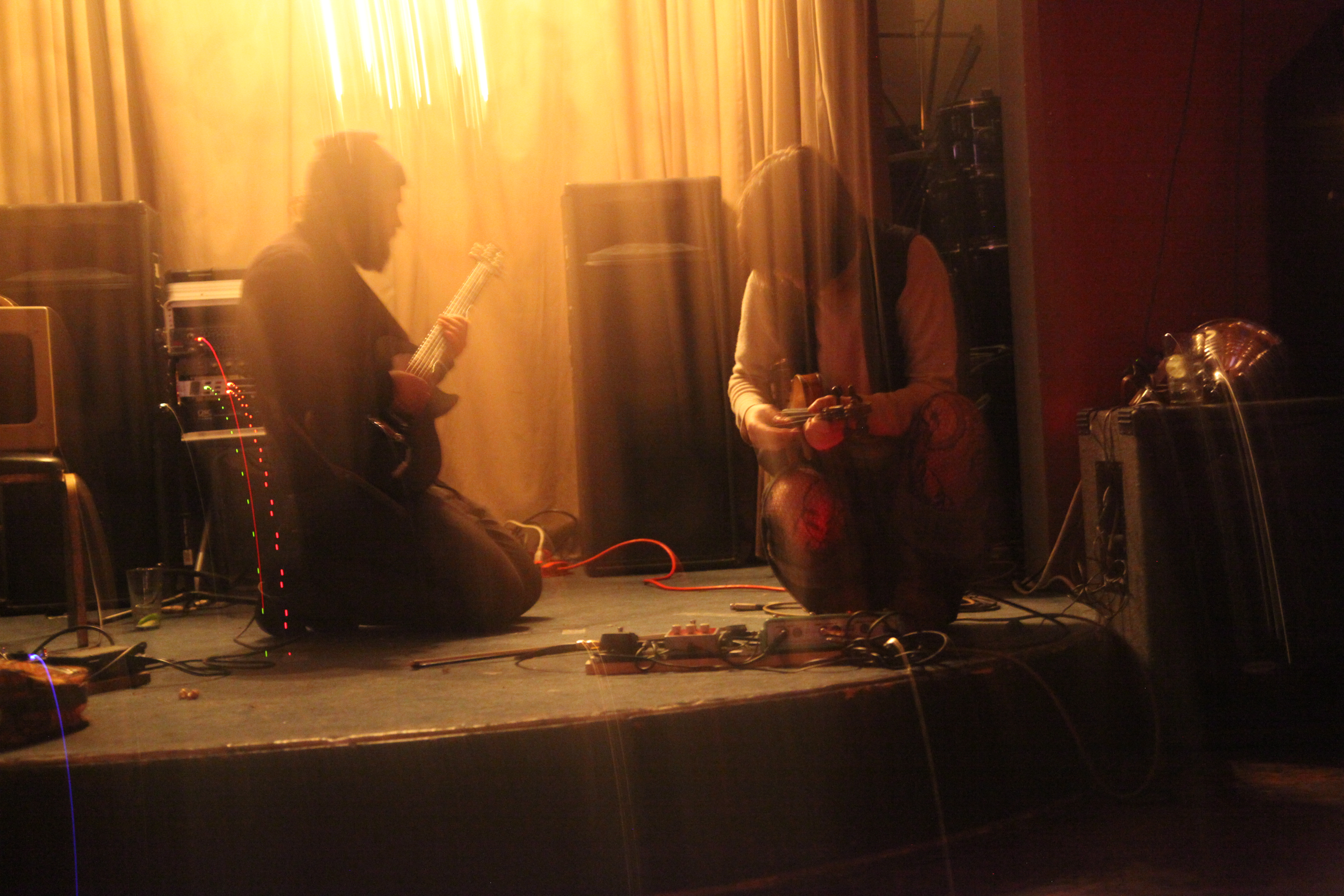
J Breeden and Sara Johanne of Susurrus Station in 2011

== Discography ==
- O.K. Carousal 2004
- (1,2) Unbuckle the Blue 2005
- Tinhorn Forlorn (ep) 2006
- Add a Day Going West 2009
- Antinomie 2012
- Clackamas Killer / Americanitis (split single with RLLRBLL) 2016
- Tinhorn Reborn (single) 2016
- Miss Anthropocene 2017
- Radio Free Memory (cover songs, scheduled 2018)
